Thomas Milligan (2 March 1904 – 17 December 1970) born in Shieldmuir, Wishaw was a Scottish professional welter/middleweight boxer of the 1920s.

Early years

Milligan was a childhood friend of Hughie Gallacher. While Gallacher decided on football over boxing, Milligan went on to have a successful career in the ring.

Championships

Continental and International
EBU Welterweight Championship
EBU Middleweight Championship (twice)
CBC Welterweight Championship
CBC Middleweight Championship

National
BBBofC Middleweight Championship
BBBofC Welterweight Championship
BBBofC Scottish Area Welterweight Championship

References

External links

Image - Tommy Milligan
Image - Tommy Milligan
Image - Tommy Milligan

1904 births
1970 deaths
Middleweight boxers
Sportspeople from Wishaw
Scottish male boxers
Welterweight boxers